The 2023 South Carolina Gamecocks football team will represent the University of South Carolina as a member of the East Division of the Southeastern Conference (SEC) during the 2023 NCAA Division I FBS football season. The Gamecocks are expected to be led by Shane Beamer in his third year as their head coach. 

The South Carolina football team plays its home games at Williams–Brice Stadium in Columbia, South Carolina.

Schedule

Coaching staff

References

South Carolina
South Carolina Gamecocks football seasons
South Carolina Gamecocks football